Bertrand I. Halperin (born December 6, 1941) is an American physicist, former holder of the Hollis Chair of Mathematicks and Natural Philosophy at the physics department of Harvard University.

Biography
Halperin was born in Brooklyn, New York, where he grew up in the Crown Heights neighborhood and attended public schools. His mother was Eva Teplitzky Halperin and his father Morris Halperin. His mother was a college administrator and his father a customs inspector. Both his parents were born in USSR. His paternal grandmother's family the Maximovs claimed descent from Rabbi Israel Baal Shem Tov, the BESHT.

He attended Harvard University (class of 1961), and did his graduate work at Berkeley with John J. Hopfield (PhD 1965). After 10 years (1966–1976) working at Bell Laboratories, Murray Hill, New Jersey he was appointed Professor of Physics at Harvard University.

In the 1970s, he, together with David R. Nelson, worked out a theory of two-dimensional melting, predicting the hexatic phase before it was experimentally observed by Pindak et al. In the 1980s, he made contributions to the theory of the Quantum Hall Effect and of the Fractional Quantum Hall Effect. His recent interests lie in the area of strongly interacting low-dimensional electron systems.<ref name="

Halperin was elected a Fellow of the American Physical Society in 1972, a member of the American Academy of Arts and Sciences in 1981, a member of the National Academy of Sciences in 1982, and a member of the American Philosophical Society in 1990. In 2001, he was awarded the Lars Onsager Prize. In 2003, he and Anthony J. Leggett were awarded the Wolf Prize in physics.  In 2016 he was Lise Meitner Distinguished Lecturer.

In 2018, he was awarded the 2019 APS Medal for Exceptional Achievement in Research, for "his seminal contributions to theoretical condensed matter physics, especially his pioneering work on the role of topology in both classical and quantum systems."

Selected bibliography 
  Pdf.

See also
Dynamic scaling

References

External links
Harvard University faculty page
Wolf Prize page

1941 births
Harvard University alumni
American people of Ukrainian-Jewish descent
21st-century American physicists
Members of the United States National Academy of Sciences
Fellows of the American Academy of Arts and Sciences
Fellows of the American Physical Society
Harvard University faculty
Jewish American scientists
Jewish physicists
Living people
Scientists at Bell Labs
University of California, Berkeley alumni
Wolf Prize in Physics laureates
Hollis Chair of Mathematics and Natural Philosophy
Oliver E. Buckley Condensed Matter Prize winners
Descendants of the Baal Shem Tov
Members of the American Philosophical Society